Thomas William Selleck (born January 29, 1945) is an American actor, television and film producer and screenwriter. His breakout role was playing private investigator Thomas Magnum in the television series Magnum, P.I. (1980–1988), for which he received five Emmy Award nominations for Outstanding Lead Actor in a Drama Series, winning in 1985. Since 2010, Selleck has co-starred as New York City Police Commissioner Frank Reagan in the series Blue Bloods. Beginning in 2005, he has portrayed troubled small-town police chief Jesse Stone in nine television films based on the Robert B. Parker novels.

In films, Selleck has played bachelor architect Peter Mitchell in Three Men and a Baby (1987), and its sequel Three Men and a Little Lady (1990). He has also appeared in more than 50 other film, and television roles since Magnum, P.I., including the films Quigley Down Under, Mr. Baseball, and Lassiter. He appeared in recurring television roles as Monica Geller's love interest Dr. Richard Burke on Friends, as Lance White, the likeable and naive partner on The Rockford Files, and as casino owner A.J. Cooper on Las Vegas. He also had a lead role in the television western film The Sacketts, based on two of Louis L'Amour's books.

Filmography

Television

Film

Stage 
2001: A Thousand Clowns - Murray

References 

Male actor filmographies
American filmographies